Pierre Offerman was the commandant of the Gangala-na-bodio elephant domestication center  and chief warden of the conservation service of the Belgian Congo, the Service des Eaux et Forêts, Chasse et Pêche.

Notes

References

Nature conservation in the Democratic Republic of the Congo
Elephant conservation
Belgian conservationists
Belgian Congo people
Belgian colonisation in Africa